In the AFL Women's (AFLW), the Richmond best and fairest award is awarded to the best and fairest player at the Richmond Football Club during the home-and-away season. The award has been awarded annually since the club's inaugural season in the competition in 2020, and Monique Conti was the inaugural winner of the award.

Recipients

See also

 Jack Dyer Medal (list of Richmond Football Club best and fairest winners in the Australian Football League)

References

AFL Women's awards
Lists of AFL Women's players
Richmond Football Club
Awards established in 2020